Bronner's can refer to the following:

 Bronner's Christmas Wonderland, the "World's Largest Christmas Store" which is located in Frankenmuth, Michigan
 Dr. Bronner's Soap, created by E. H. Bronner